Government Medical College, Sangareddy is a medical college located in Sangareddy.

History 
The building was constructed at a cost of ₹30 crore and the construction was completed in 2022. The college was permitted to start classes from the academic year 2022-2023 with an intake of 150 undergraduate students.

The college was inaugurated as part of 8 medical colleges inaugurated by K. Chandrashekhar Rao on November 15, 2022.

References 

Medical colleges in Telangana